Sultan Abdul Jalil Shah III ibni Almarhum Sultan Alauddin Riayat Shah III was the Sultan of Johor who reigned from 1623 to 1677. Known as "Raja Bujang" before his accession, he was a son of the 5th Sultan, Alauddin Riayat Shah III and a nephew of the 6th Sultan, Abdullah Ma'ayat Shah.

Ruler of Pahang and Sultan of Johor-Pahang
In 1615, Alauddin Riayat Shah III signed a peace treaty with the Portuguese Malacca, and as a sign of gratitude, the Portuguese recognised Raja Bujang as the ruler of Pahang, replacing Alauddin Riayat Shah who was deposed earlier in 1615 by the Acehnese. However, the appointment was not recognised by Sultan Iskandar Muda of Acheh, which later invaded Pahang and forced Raja Bujang to flee to the islands of Lingga. At the same time, the Achehnese waged war with the new Sultan of Johor, Abdullah Ma'ayat Shah who was also forced to flee to Lingga. As the Achehnese attacks continued, Raja Bujang and Sultan Abdullah fled once again to Tambelan archipelago. When Sultan Abdullah died in 1623, Acheh reconciled with Raja Bujang and appointed him as the new Sultan of Johor and Pahang.

Invasion of Malacca

The strength of Acheh was brought to an end with a disastrous campaign against Malacca in 1629, when the combined Portuguese and Johor forces managed to destroy the fleet and 19,000 Achehnese troops according to Portuguese account. Johor later grew stronger and formed an alliance with the Dutch to attack the Portuguese Malacca and conquered it on January 14, 1641, ending the triangular war. Subsequently in the following month, Iskandar Thani of Acheh died and was succeeded by Queen Taj ul-Alam. Her reign marks the beginning of decline of Acheh position as a regional power.

In 1641, Sultan Abdul Jalil Shah III moved to the mainland Johor and established his new capital in Makam Tauhid. He spent two years of his reign in Makam Tauhid before he crossed the Damar river to establish his new capital in Pasir Raja (also known as Batu Sawar) in October 1642.

Jambi emerged as a regional economic and political power in the early 17th century.  Initially there was an attempt of an alliance between Johor and Jambi with a promised marriage between the heir Raja Muda and daughter of the Pengeran of Jambi.  However, the Raja Muda married instead the daughter of the Laksamana, who was concerned about the dilution of power from such an alliance and so offered his own daughter for marriage. The alliance broke down, and between 1666-1679, a long war erupted and Jambi successfully sacked the Johor capital in Batu Sawar in 1673. Sultan Abdul Jalil Shah III fled to Pahang and made it as his administration centre for four years before he died in Kuala Pahang in 1677.

References
Notes

Sources
 

17th-century Sultans of Pahang
Sultans of Johor
1677 deaths
Year of birth missing
Monarchs who abdicated